Iosif Boroş (born 19 March 1953) is a retired Romanian handball player who won bronze medals at the 1980 and 1984 Olympics. At the club level he first played for HC Minaur Baia Mare, and in 1990 he moved to Spain.

References

External links
profile

1953 births
Living people
Romanian male handball players
Sportspeople from Brașov 
Handball players at the 1980 Summer Olympics
Handball players at the 1984 Summer Olympics
Olympic handball players of Romania
Olympic bronze medalists for Romania
Olympic medalists in handball
Medalists at the 1984 Summer Olympics
Medalists at the 1980 Summer Olympics